Robert N. Skir (born 3 January 1961) is a writer best known for his work in television animation on shows including X-Men, Gargoyles, Batman: The Animated Series, and Spider-Man.  He co-created and served as Story Editor on programs including Transformers: Beast Machines, Extreme Ghostbusters, Godzilla: The Series, and DinoSquad, and co-developed the series X-Men: Evolution. From 1991-2003, he frequently collaborated with Marty Isenberg.

His work on the series Transformers: Beast Machines, was highly controversial, gaining favor among new viewers but polarizing many—but not all—longtime Transformers fans. Since then, the show has gained a cult following, consisting partially of fans who rejected the show when it first aired.    His short story "Singularity Ablyss" was published in the anthology Transformers: Legends.

Skir's work on the Pocket Dragon Adventures episode "Festival of Lights" earned him a nomination for the Humanitas Award.

Skir has taught numerous classes in Animation Writing at UCLA's Department of Film, Television, and Digital Media.

Television credits
• series head writer denoted in bold
Beetlejuice (1991)
Little Shop (1991)
Batman: The Animated Series (1992, 1994)
Dog City (1992-1994)
The Legends of Treasure Island (1993)
Stone Protectors (1993)
X-Men (1993-1994)
Red Planet (1994)
Spider-Man (1994, 1996-1997)
BattleTech: The Animated Series (1995)
Ultraforce (1995): eps 10-13
Gargoyles (1996)
The Mask: Animated Series (1996)
Superman: The Animated Series (1996)
Mighty Ducks: The Animated Series (1996-1997)
Extreme Ghostbusters (1997)
The Adventures of Sam & Max: Freelance Police (1997-1998)
Pocket Dragon Adventures (1998)
Godzilla: The Series (1998-2000)
Beast Machines: Transformers (1999-2000)
Action Man (2000-2001)
The Mummy (2001, 2003)
DinoSquad (2007-2008)
Transformers: Prime (2012)
Kaijudo (2013)
Super Monsters (2017)
Tarzan and Jane (2018)

References

External links

BobSkir.com (archived)

American animators
American television writers
American male television writers
Living people
1961 births